Orrall & Wright was an American country music duo composed of Robert Ellis Orrall and Curtis Wright. Both members had recorded solo albums and had charted singles of their own prior to Orrall & Wright's inception. As Orrall & Wright, they charted two more singles and recorded a self-titled album on the Giant label.

Unlike most other country music duos present at the time, Orrall & Wright's members shared lead vocals on every song that they recorded. Although active for only one year, they received a Duo of the Year nomination from the Country Music Association. By the end of 1994, both members resumed their solo careers. Wright joined the band Shenandoah, in which he served as lead singer until being replaced with Jimmy Yeary in 2007. After leaving Shenandoah, he joined Pure Prairie League. Orrall, meanwhile, has continued a solo career.

Orrall & Wright (1994)

Track listing
"She Loves Me Like She Means It" (Angelo, Robert Ellis Orrall, Billy Spencer) – 2:44
"The Last Time I Loved Like That" (Orrall, Curtis Wright) – 3:50
"I'm Outta Here" (T. J. Knight, Wright) – 3:21
"Fall Reaching" (Josh Leo, Orrall) – 3:31
"What Do You Want from Me" (Orrall, Wright) – 3:01
"Go West Young Man" (Orrall, Wright, Spencer) – 3:22
"You Saved Me" (Wright) – 3:03
"Pound, Pound, Pound" (Orrall, Dale Jarvis) – 3:11
"If You Could Say What I'm Thinking" (Orrall, Wright) – 3:43
"I'll Tell You When I Get There" (Petraglia, Orrall, Wright) – 2:43

Personnel
Orrall & Wright
Robert Ellis Orrall - vocals, keyboards
Curtis Wright - vocals, electric guitar
Additional musicians
 Eddie Bayers - drums
 Mike Brignardello - bass guitar
 Larry Byrom - acoustic guitar
 Bill Cuomo - keyboards
 Dan Dugmore - steel guitar
 Stuart Duncan - fiddle
 Sonny Garrish - steel guitar
 Dann Huff - electric guitar
Technical
Marc Frigo - mixing assistant
Mark Hagen - mixing assistant
Julian King - recording, mixing assistant
Robert Ellis Orrall - production
Lynn Peterzell - production, recording, mixing
Denny Purcell - mastering
James Stroud - executive production
Craig White - recording
Curtis Wright - production

Singles

Music videos

References

American country music groups
Country music duos
Musical groups established in 1994
Giant Records (Warner) artists